Ahmad Meshari al-Adwani (1923 in Kuwait — 17 June 1990) was a poet and teacher who wrote the lyrics of the national anthem of Kuwait, Al-Nasheed Al-Watani.

In 1938, he graduated from the "al-Mubarakiyah" Secondary School, Kuwait. In 1939 he travelled to Cairo, Egypt, and was admitted into the College of Arabic Language Studies at the Al-Azhar University. In 1949 he graduated from the Al-Azhar University. In 1950 Al-Adwani established the monthly magazine Al-Be'thah in Cairo, with his friend and companion, Dr. Abdulaziz Hussein. Due to lack of funding, however, the magazine was stopped after only three issues. In 1952 he helped establish the "Al-Ra'ed" magazine, published by the Kuwait Teachers Club. 

He died in 1990 at 67.

1923 births
1990 deaths
20th-century Kuwaiti people
20th-century Kuwaiti poets
National anthem writers
Al-Azhar University alumni
Kuwaiti expatriates in Egypt